Abdul Nasir Saeed (born 28 June 2002) is a Ghanaian professional footballer who plays as a midfielder for Ghanaian Premier League side Dreams F.C.

Career 
Saeed is a graduate of the Dreams FC youth team. Ahead of the 2020–21 Ghana Premier League season, he was promoted named on the team's senior squad list as the league was set to restart in November 2020. On 3 February 2021, he made his debut in the 3–0 victory over West African Football Academy, coming on in the 88th minute for Farhadu Suleiman.

References

External links 
 

Living people
2002 births
Association football midfielders
Ghanaian footballers
Dreams F.C. (Ghana) players
Ghana Premier League players